Beaver River is a small rural community that straddles the Digby County and Yarmouth County line, located on the southwest coast of Nova Scotia, Canada, near the town of Yarmouth.

Beaver River was originally named Elsetcook which was a Mikmaq word meaning "Flowing by high banks".  The first settlers, who rarely accepted outsiders to their settlement, had last names such as: Hersey, Landers, Pitman, Sanders, Crosby, Patten, Cann, Goudey, Perry, Jeffrey, Tedford, Corning, Killam, Trask, Blackadar, Byrnes, Phillips, Kelley, Porter, and Sollows. Many of these names are still quite common around Yarmouth County today. (List from "Brown's History of Yarmouth County") There are three recently restored cemeteries now maintained by the Old Beaver River and Port Maitland Cemeteries Preservation Society where many of these early settlers are buried.

References

General Service Areas in Nova Scotia
Communities in Digby County, Nova Scotia